Big Boing may refer to:
Big Bounce, a cosmic theory
A character in Kido and Dr. Riddles, a manga/anime series